Live Corruption is a live album by the English band Napalm Death released in 1992. It was recorded live at the Salisbury Arts Centre, England on 30 June 1990. The band performed various songs composed by the original line-up.

Track listing

Credits
Mark "Barney" Greenway - vocals
Jesse Pintado - lead guitar
Mitch Harris - rhythm guitar
Shane Embury - bass
Mick Harris - drums

Video Dir: Steve Payne -  Paynie
Video Producer: Steve Mallet

Napalm Death live albums
Live video albums
1992 live albums